Dickens County is a county located in the U.S. state of Texas. As of the 2020 census, its population was 1,770. Its county seat is Dickens. The county was created in 1876 and later organized in 1891. Both the county and its seat are named for J. Dickens, who died at the Battle of the Alamo.

Geography

Major highways
   U.S. Highway 82 / State Highway 114
  State Highway 70
  State Highway 208

Adjacent counties

 Motley County (north)
 King County (east)
 Kent County (south)
 Crosby County (west)
 Garza County (southwest)
 Floyd County (northwest)
 Cottle County (northeast)
 Stonewall County (southeast)

Demographics

Note: the US Census treats Hispanic/Latino as an ethnic category. This table excludes Latinos from the racial categories and assigns them to a separate category. Hispanics/Latinos can be of any race.

As of the census of 2000,  2,762 people, 980 households, and 638 families resided in the county.  The population density was 3 people per square mile (1/km2).  The 1,368 housing units averaged 2 per square mile (1/km2).  The racial makeup of the county was 77.62% White, 8.18% African American, 0.36% Native American, 0.11% Asian, 0.25% Pacific Islander, 12.35% from other races, and 1.12% from two or more races.  About 23.90% of the population was Hispanic or Latino of any race.

Of the 980 households, 23.10% had children under the age of 18 living with them, 54.60% were married couples living together, 7.90% had a female householder with no husband present, and 34.80% were not families. About 32.40% of all households were made up of individuals, and 17.60% had someone living alone who was 65 years of age or older.  The average household size was 2.29 and the average family size was 2.89.

In the county, the population was distributed as 18.50% under the age of 18, 10.40% from 18 to 24, 29.70% from 25 to 44, 22.40% from 45 to 64, and 19.00% who were 65 years of age or older.  The median age was 39 years. For every 100 females, there were 130.70 males.  For every 100 females age 18 and over, there were 141.90 males.

Males had a median income of $25,000 versus $18,571 for females. The per capita income for the county was $13,156. About 14.10% of families and 17.40% of the population were below the poverty line, including 21.30% of those under age 18 and 18.20% of those age 65 or over.

Communities

Cities
 Dickens (county seat)
 Spur

Unincorporated communities
 Afton
 McAdoo

Notable residents
 Charles Weldon Cannon, rancher and boot and saddle manufacturer
 Marshall Formby, attorney, newspaper publisher, radio executive, and politician

Elected leadership

Politics
Dickens County is presently in Texas House of Representatives District 68, represented by Republican David Spiller, an attorney from Jacksboro, since his election on March 9, 2021.   With redistricting following the 2020 Census, effective January 1, 2023, Dickens County will be realigned to House District 83, represented by Republican Dustin Burrows, an attorney from Lubbock.  In the Texas Senate, Dickens County is presently in District 28, represented by Republican Charles Perry.

Like much of North Texas, Dickens is heavily Republican, giving less than 15% of the vote to Hillary Clinton in 2016, though it did support her husband, Bill Clinton, in both 1992 and 1996, in the former election supporting him by double digits over Texan native George Bush. It had previously even voted against Ronald Reagan by large margins in both 1980 and 1984.

See also

 National Register of Historic Places listings in Dickens County, Texas
 Recorded Texas Historic Landmarks in Dickens County

References

External links

 Dickens County in Handbook of Texas Online at the University of Texas
 Historic Dickens County materials, hosted by the Portal to Texas History.
 Dickens County History at HistoricTexas.net
 Dickens County Profile from the Texas Association of Counties 

 
1891 establishments in Texas
Populated places established in 1891